Gustave Lemieux (19 December 1864 – 19 July 1956) was a Canadian politician.

Born in Montreal, Canada East, Lemieux was acclaimed to the Legislative Assembly of Quebec for Gaspéin 1912. A Liberal, he was re-elected in 1916, 1919, 1923, and 1927. He was appointed to the Legislative Council of Quebec for Montarville in 1932 and served until his death in 1956.

His brothers, Louis-Joseph Lemieux and Rodolphe Lemieux, were both politicians.

References

1864 births
1956 deaths
Politicians from Montreal
Quebec Liberal Party MLCs
Quebec Liberal Party MNAs
Vice Presidents of the National Assembly of Quebec